Waidhofen may refer to the following places:

Waidhofen an der Ybbs, a town in Lower Austria, Austria
Waidhofen an der Thaya, a town in Lower Austria, Austria
Waidhofen an der Thaya-Land, a municipality in Lower Austria, Austria
Waidhofen an der Thaya (district), a district in Lower Austria, Austria
Waidhofen, Bavaria, a municipality in Bavaria, Germany